Paano Na Kaya? is the first album of Pinoy Dream Academy Season 2 first runner up, Bugoy Drilon. It has 12 tracks in which the last 6 songs are the minus ones of the first 6 songs. The album has been awarded a gold record plaque on July 19, 2009.

Track listing 
Paano Na Kaya?
Kung P'wede Lang Sana
Muli
Bakit Ba?
Simulan Mo Sa Isang Pangarap
Lahat Ng 'Yan
Paano Na Kaya? (Minus One)
Kung P'wede Lang Sana (Minus One)
Muli (Minus One)
Bakit Ba? (Minus One)
Simulan Mo Sa Isang Pangarap (Minus One)
Lahat Ng 'Yan (Minus One)

Singles

Paano Na Kaya? 
Paano Na Kaya? is the first single from Bugoy Drilon's first album having the same title. The song was composed by the Headmaster of the Pinoy Dream Academy (Season 2), Ryan Cayabyab for the album, Scholars Sing Cayabyab. The song peaked at number 1 in some radio charts in the Philippines like WRR 101.9 and Radyo Natin. The song won the Senti Award in the 1st Waki OPM Awards by the WRR 101.9. This song is also later used as a soundtrack of the 2010 film of the same title, starring Kim Chiu and Gerald Anderson.

Muli 
Muli is an original song by Rodel Naval. It is the 2nd single from the album and the second number 1 hit of Bugoy after Paano Na Kaya. The song is also included in the soundtrack of ABS-CBN's Philippine remake of koreanovela, "Only You".

Kung P'wede Lang Sana 
This is the third single of Bugoy and the 3rd consecutive number 1 song of Bugoy in the WRR chart.

References

External links
 Titik Pilipino

2008 debut albums
Star Music albums